Marika Tuus-Laul (born 12 May 1951, in Tallinn) is an Estonian politician. She has been member of X, XI, XII and XIII Riigikogu.

In 1976, she graduated from Tallinn University in cultural education. In 1986, he graduated from University of Tartu in journalism.

From 1987 to 2002 she worked at Eesti Televisioon (ETV) as a presenter, editor, chief editor and producer.

Since 2003 she is a member of Estonian Centre Party.

References

1951 births
21st-century Estonian women politicians
Estonian Centre Party politicians
Estonian editors
Estonian television presenters
Estonian television producers
Estonian women editors
Estonian women television producers
Living people
Members of the Riigikogu, 2003–2007
Members of the Riigikogu, 2007–2011
Members of the Riigikogu, 2011–2015
Members of the Riigikogu, 2015–2019
Members of the Riigikogu, 2019–2023
Politicians from Tallinn
Tallinn University alumni
University of Tartu alumni
Women members of the Riigikogu